The Gads Hill Train Robbery (also known as the Great Missouri Train Robbery) was a crime committed by the James-Younger Gang in Gads Hill, Missouri. In January 1874, five members of the James-Younger gang robbed a train and stole $12,000 in cash. All five escaped. 

The robbery has since been recognized as one of the most infamous crimes committed by outlaws in the American Old West.

Background
It was the prime of the wild west in the United States, with frequent stagecoach robberies, bank robberies, train robberies and gunfights occurring in an untamed land. Outlaws such as Billy the Kid, Wild Bill Hickok and Jesse James were quickly gaining traction as well-known outlaws in the 1870s. Due to minimal government presence in the western half of the U.S., crime rates were high, and outlaws often getting away with their crimes.

James-Younger gang
The James-Younger Gang was a gang of outlaws consisting of well-known criminal Jesse James and his brother, Frank James; Cole, Jim, John and Bob Younger, as well as other gunslingers. After fighting for the losing side in the American Civil War (1861 - 1865), the James brothers formed a gang in 1866 and committed mass crimes in Missouri, until their gang eventually collapsed in 1876 after a botched bank robbery in Minnesota.

Previous train robbery
In July 1873, Jesse and Frank James robbed a train in Adair, Iowa, and stole $6,000 in cash. However, they soon ran out of money and began plotting a new train robbery. By now, the gang had acquired new members, including the three oldest Younger brothers.

Robbery
On January 31, 1874, five men, believed to have been Jesse and Frank James, Cole Younger, Jim Younger and John Younger, entered the small town of Gads Hill, Missouri, and robbed the general store. Afterwards, they proceeded to hold the townspeople hostage inside the store. A train was expected to arrive there at 4:00 pm that day, but it ended up being forty-five minutes late. However, when it did arrive, the James-Younger gang created a bonfire on the train tracks and waved a red flag in front of it to make the train conductor stop immediately.

After entering the train, the gang proceeded with the robbery. However, they avoided robbing women and working men. It is said they did this by looking at every passenger's hands to see how much callus they had. While some of the gang members were handling the passengers, the rest broke open the safe and  stole more money. All five robbers managed to escape unharmed, with a total of $12,000 (worth $312,000 present day) stolen.

Aftermath
Following one of the James-Younger gang's most successful robberies, the Pinkerton National Detective Agency began attempting to hunt down the members of the gang, particularly the ones responsible for the train robbery. In March, 1874, John Younger was killed during a shootout with Jim and three lawmen in Saint Clair, Missouri.

References

Train robberies
1874 in Missouri
1874 crimes in the United States